Martin Sturfält (born 1979 in Katrineholm) is a Swedish classical pianist.

Biography
Martin studied at the Stockholm Royal College of Music and at the Guildhall School of Music & Drama in London. His principal teachers were Esther Bodin-Karpe and Stefan Bojsten in Stockholm, and Paul Roberts and Ronan O’Hora in London.

Martin began giving regular concerts at the age of 11, and has since performed throughout Scandinavia, UK and the rest of Europe, as well as in Asia and the USA.

Martin has appeared with the Hallé Orchestra, the Royal Stockholm Philharmonic and the Swedish Radio Symphony, collaborating with conductors such as Sir Mark Elder, Andrew Manze and Alexander Vedernikov.

Discography
2008: Stenhammar: Piano Music

2012: Wiklund: Piano Concertos

Reviews
 Opus (4/2012) Wiklund ska man ha

External links
 Hyperion Records

References
 Katrineholms-Kuriren. (17 Oct 2009) Martin Sturfält blev årets kulturpristagare

Swedish classical pianists
Male classical pianists
1979 births
Living people
21st-century classical pianists
21st-century Swedish male musicians